The Delaware Memorial Bridge is a dual-span suspension bridge crossing the Delaware River. The toll bridges carry Interstate 295 and U.S. Route 40 and is also the link between Delaware and New Jersey. The bridge was designed by the firm known today as HNTB with consulting help from engineer Othmar Ammann, whose other designs include the Walt Whitman Bridge (which is similar in appearance to each of the Delaware Memorial Bridge spans, except for being a single span with more lanes) and the Verrazzano-Narrows Bridge. It is also one of only two crossings of the Delaware River with both U.S. Highway and Interstate Highway designations, the other being the Benjamin Franklin Bridge.

The bridges provide a regional connection for long-distance travelers. While not a part of Interstate 95, they connect two parts of the highway: the Delaware Turnpike (Interstate 95 in Delaware) on the south side with the New Jersey Turnpike (later Interstate 95 in New Jersey) on the north side. They also connect Interstate 495, U.S. Route 13, and Route 9 in New Castle, Delaware with U.S. Route 130 in Pennsville Township, New Jersey (at the settlement of Deepwater, New Jersey).

The bridges are dedicated to those from both New Jersey and Delaware who died in World War II, the Korean War, the Vietnam War, and the Persian Gulf War. On the Delaware side of the bridge is a War Memorial, visible from the northbound-side lanes. The toll facility is operated by the Delaware River and Bay Authority.

The Delaware Memorial Bridge is the southernmost and the largest fixed vehicular crossing of the Delaware River. It is also the only fixed vehicular crossing between Delaware and New Jersey. However, at Fort Mott, New Jersey, there is a small amount of land on the New Jersey side of the river that is part of the State of Delaware, and thus there are pedestrian crossings in between those states, but not spanning the river. The Cape May–Lewes Ferry provides an alternate route between travelers from New Jersey and the Northeastern states to southern Delaware.

History

The first span
Following the opening of the Benjamin Franklin Bridge in Philadelphia, residents of Delaware and New Jersey began to advocate a crossing of the river in the area of Wilmington, Delaware. As commercial pressures mounted, a ferry service began, as an interim measure, to run in 1926, near the bridge's current location. Advocates of a bridge crossing between Delaware and New Jersey faced strong opposition from the Philadelphia Port Authorities, which claimed that the bridge would be a menace to navigation. The U.S. Navy and U.S. Coast Guard were also concerned that the bridge would be vulnerable to an enemy attack. If the bridge were to collapse into the river, it could render the Philadelphia Navy Yard unusable.

As traffic by cars and truck increased rapidly, the benefits of a bridge in this area became evident, and its construction was authorized by the highway departments of Delaware and New Jersey in 1945. Originally, a two-lane highway tunnel was considered, but the costs for a four-lane bridge was found to be equivalent in price, therefore being the reason a four-lane bridge was chosen. Congress approved the bridge project on July 13, 1946, and its construction began on February 1, 1949.

The first span opened to traffic on August 16, 1951, and at the time was the sixth-longest main suspension span in the world. The Governor of Delaware, Elbert N. Carvel, and the Governor of New Jersey, Alfred E. Driscoll, dedicated the bridge to each state's war dead from World War II.

The bridge quickly proved a popular travel route when the New Jersey Turnpike connection was completed at its north end. By 1955, nearly eight million vehicles were crossing the bridge each year, nearly twice the original projection. By 1960, the bridge was carrying more than 15 million cars and trucks per year, and this increased even more when the bridge was linked to the new Delaware Turnpike, Interstate 95, in November 1963.

The second span
At a cost of $77 million, the second span of the Delaware Memorial Bridge opened on September 12, 1968, and was dedicated to those soldiers from Delaware and New Jersey killed in the Korean War and Vietnam War. The original span was closed down for fifteen months for refurbishment: its suspenders were replaced and its deck and median barrier were removed and replaced with a single deck to allow four undivided lanes of traffic. Finally, on December 29, 1969, all eight lanes of the Delaware Memorial Bridge Twin Span opened to traffic, making it the world's second longest twin suspension bridge.

While they are similar in basic appearance, major differences can be seen between the original and second spans. The original span was constructed of riveted steel plates, and it has an open-grate shoulder access walk. In contrast, the second span was constructed mostly of welded steel plates (with heavy riveted joints in crucial areas) and it has concrete access walks.

The original suspension span carries northbound traffic for Interstate 295, whereas the newer span carries the southbound traffic. Crossover lanes on each side of the bridge can allow for two-way traffic on one span if the other has to be closed for an extensive period of time.

1969–present
The bridge had a close call with disaster when on July 9, 1969, the oil tanker Regent Liverpool struck the fender system protecting the tower piers. The bridge itself was spared damage, but the fender suffered about $1.0 million in damage.

The Delaware River and Bay Authority (DRBA) began a $13 million project in 2003 to resurface the bridge, refurbish the expansion joints, upgrade the electrical system, and replace the elevators in the four towers. This work was completed in 2008.

In 2022 the DRBA began a project to apply ultra-high performance concrete to the driving surface of the eastbound span.

, more than 80,000 vehicles cross the twin spans on their combined total of eight lanes daily.

On clear days, the skyline of Philadelphia is visible in the distance on the left going to New Jersey and on the right leaving New Jersey. Wilmington, Delaware, only a few miles away from the bridge, is also visible.  Other landmarks that can be seen from the bridge includes the cooling tower for PSEG's Hope Creek Nuclear Generating Station near Salem, New Jersey, the Delaware City Refinery in Delaware City, Delaware, the Reedy Point Bridge, also in Delaware City, both the St. Georges Bridge and the Senator William V. Roth Jr. Bridge in St. Georges, Delaware, and the Commodore Barry Bridge in Chester, Pennsylvania.

The largest single day of traffic had 79,488 private and commercial vehicles cross the bridge one-way on November 29, 2009. The largest single weekend for traffic totals had 211,685 vehicles cross the bridge one-way, August 16–18, 2019.

Toll

One-way tolls for traffic entering Delaware (westbound) were instituted in 1992. , the toll is $5.00 for passenger vehicles using cash and $4.75 using a Delaware or New Jersey issued E-ZPass. Frequent Traveler discounts are available. About $270,000 in tolls are collected daily. The DRBA has originally proposed to raise the toll from $4.00 to $5.00 on March 1, 2019, however New Jersey Governor Phil Murphy vetoed this plan on January 3, 2019. In February, the DRBA and the governors of Delaware and New Jersey reached an agreement which postponed the toll hike to May 1, as well as providing a 25 cent E-ZPass discount for passenger vehicles. The frequent traveler rate increased from $1.25 to $1.75.

Prior to the introduction of E-ZPass, both tokens and frequent traveler tickets were used, with special, discounted ticket books for local residents. They were phased out upon the introduction of the new system, and the tokens are no longer valid.

War Memorial
Since opening of the first bridge in 1951, annual ceremonies are held at the bridge's War Memorial on Memorial Day and Veterans Day to honor the sacrifices of American war veterans. The memorial is located in Veterans Memorial Park in New Castle, Delaware, and it features a reflecting pool, a statue of a soldier, and a wall containing the names of 15,000 men and women from Delaware and New Jersey who were killed in World War II, the Korean War, the War in Vietnam, and the Persian Gulf War.

Gallery

See also

 List of crossings of the Delaware River
 List of longest bridges
 List of bridges in the United States
 List of longest suspension bridge spans

References

Further reading

External links

 
 Delaware State Code Title 17, Chapter 3 Legal framework for Delaware Memorial Bridge
 Delaware State Code Title 17, Chapter 18 Legal framework for Delaware River and Bay Authority
 Delaware Memorial Bridge Advanced Traffic Management System
 
 
 

Bridges completed in 1951
Bridges completed in 1968
Bridges over the Delaware River
Bridges in New Castle County, Delaware
Transportation buildings and structures in Salem County, New Jersey
Interstate 95
Delaware River and Bay Authority facilities
World War II memorials in the United States
Monuments and memorials in Delaware
Monuments and memorials in New Jersey
Suspension bridges in the United States
Toll bridges in Delaware
Toll bridges in New Jersey
Tolled sections of Interstate Highways
U.S. Route 40
Road bridges in New Jersey
Road bridges in Delaware
Bridges by Othmar Ammann
Bridges on the Interstate Highway System
Bridges of the United States Numbered Highway System
Towers in Delaware
Steel bridges in the United States
Pennsville Township, New Jersey
Buildings and structures in New Castle, Delaware
Interstate vehicle bridges in the United States
1951 establishments in Delaware
1951 establishments in New Jersey